This is a list of the largest companies of Nazi Germany by employees in 1938.

Companies by employees

The list is based on Fiedler (1999a, 1999b), who compiled data from a variety of sources. Given the shortage of historical employment data some employment numbers are only estimates and some companies might be missing from this list. Employment numbers are including all subsidiaries as long as the parent company is the majority shareholder, that is, holds more than 50 percent of the stock. An exception is Telefunken, which is included in the list as it was a joint venture of Siemens and Allgemeine Elektricitäts-Gesellschaft which each company holding 50 percent of the shares of Telefunken. Employee numbers are not including those employed in foreign subsidiaries. The only three companies in 1938 with large foreign subsidiaries were Siemens with 11.2 percent of the workforce employed abroad, Allgemeine Elektrizitäts-Gesellschaft with less than 20 percent and Mannesmann with 10 percent. In 1938 seven of the 100 largest German companies were subsidiaries of foreign companies, all of them included in the list. The seven foreign-controlled companies were the subsidiaries of Luxembourgish Arbed (Felten & Guilleaume, Eschweiler Bergwerksverein and Burbacher Hütte), American General Motors (Adam Opel), American International Telephone & Telegraph (Deutsche I.T.& T.-Gruppe), American Singer Corporation (Singer Nähmaschinen), French de Wendel group (de Wendelsche Berg-und Hüttenwerke), Belgian Solvay (Deutsche Solvay) and Dutch-British Royal Dutch Shell (Rhenania Ossag Mineralölwerke).

See also
 Economic history of Germany
 Economy of Nazi Germany
 List of companies by employees
 List of German companies by employees in 1907

Notes

References

External links
 Big Business webpage by Peter Wardley

!
Employees 1938
Companies, Employees
Companies, Employees 1938